Askold's Grave is a historical park on the steep right bank of the Dnipro River in Kyiv between Mariinskyi Park and the Kyiv Pechersk Lavra complex.

Overview
The park was created by the Soviets in the mid-1930s in place of an old graveyard around the Church of St. Nicholas, which, as the story goes, marks the place where Prince Askold of Kyiv was buried in the 9th century.

In the Middle Ages, Askold's Grave was known as the Hungarian tract. According to the Primary Chronicle, it was the place where the Magyars crossed the Dnipro on the way from the Russian steppes to Pannonia. Archeological excavations have revealed a 9th-century dirham hoard and some remains of Izyaslav II's wooden palace. There's a modern stele commemorating the Magyar migration.

In the 15th and 16th centuries, Askold's Grave was settled by the Orthodox monks of St. Nicholas's Monastery. Hetman Mazepa had the monastery moved to a nearby hill, where a new Baroque penticupolar cathedral was then erected. The existing church of St. Nicholas is a modest Neoclassical rotunda designed by Andrey Melensky in 1810.

A new golden-domed chapel was built on the bank of the Dnipro in 2000. The style is Ukrainian Baroque revival. The chapel is dedicated to Saint Andrew Protokletos and belongs to the Moscow Patriarchate of the Ukrainian Orthodox Church.

Points of interest
 Landmark of Architecture "St.Nicholas Church"
 National Landmark of Archaeology "Uhorske village"
 Chapels: St. Andrew, Exaltation of Cross
 Memorial burial (rebuilt, partially): Memorial to Holodomor victims, Memorial to Heroes of the Battle of Kruty
 Monument to Saint Andrew the First-Called

Lost landmarks
 Priest's House
 Bell tower
 St. Nicholas Hermitage
 Necropolis (original)

Opera
The Opera Askold's grave composed by Russian composer Alexey Verstovsky and premiered in 1835,tells the story of how Askold and Dir happen to be buried in Askold's grave by Olga of Kiev.

Gallery

References

External links 

Cemeteries in Kyiv
Parks in Kyiv
Landmarks in Kyiv
National Landmarks in Kyiv
Tourist attractions in Kyiv
Pecherskyi District
Monuments and memorials in Ukraine